The Association of Gardeners, Settlers, and Animal Breeders was a mass organization of the German Democratic Republic from 1959 until shortly after German reunification in 1990. The association worked to assist and improve the economic stances of allotment gardeners and small animal breeders, such as dogs and goats.

Initially founded in 1953, its creation was rejected by the ruling Socialist Unity Party, and it took another six years for the organization to be officially consecrated.

In 1988, the association had over 1.5 million members, and it was officially dissolved on December 31, 1990, two months after reunification.

See also
National Front (East Germany)
Peasants Mutual Aid Association

References

Organisations based in East Germany
Mass organisations of East Germany
1950s establishments in Germany
1990s disestablishments in Germany